The African Championships records in swimming performances in each event at the biennial African Swimming Championships. The championships are organised by the African Swimming Confederation (CANA), and were last held in September 2018 in Algiers, Algeria. All events are held in long course (50 m) swimming pools.

Men's events

Women's events

Mixed relay

References

External links
*African Swimming Confederation

African Championships
Records
Swimming records
African Championships in swimming